Roy Wood is an English musician.

Roy Wood is also the name of:

Roy Wood (baseball) (1892–1974), American baseball player
Roy Wood Sr. (1915-1995) American radio pioneer, civil rights journalist, commentator, college professor, and entrepreneur
Roy Wood Jr. (born 1978), American comedian
Royden Wood (born 1930), English footballer

See also
Roy Woods, Canadian rapper
Roy Wood Sellars (1880–1973), American philosopher